Kolyvan is an urban locality (an urban-type settlement) and the administrative center of Kolyvansky District of Novosibirsk Oblast, Russia, located on the Ob River  to the north of Novosibirsk. Population:

History
Until the 1890s, Kolyvan was the commercial center of the surrounding area.
During the construction of the Trans-Siberian Railway in the 1890s, there were plans to route the railroad through Kolyvan and Tomsk. Despite the protests of Kolyvan and Tomsk merchants, Garin-Mikhailovsky's southern route was approved by Alexander III in 1892.

The bridge was built at Krivoshchekovo; the new city of  Novo-Nikolayevsk (later renamed Novosibirsk) arose around the bridge, and eventually became Siberia's largest city, meanwhile Kolyvan stagnated.

Culture
The majority of the log houses in Kolyvan are over two hundred years old, making the settlement a historical monument in itself.

Works by Kolyvan craftsmen are exhibited in the Hermitage Museum in St. Petersburg.

Local attractions include a museum of local history and a Russian Orthodox convent.

Architecture

Notable residents
 Vladimir Zhernakov was a Russian merchant, public figure and politician, serving as the first city head of Novonikolyevsk, from 1909 to 1914.

References

External links
Petr Marsakov, "From the Early History of Novo-Nikolayevsk - Novosibirsk Gornitsa (magazine), Novosibirsk, 1995, No. 3, p. 54-56.

Urban-type settlements in Novosibirsk Oblast